"Mrs. Todd's Shortcut" is a short story by Stephen King, first published in the May 1984 issue of Redbook magazine, and collected in King's 1985 collection Skeleton Crew.

Plot summary

David, friend of a caretaker named Homer, is an elderly man who is spending his later years hanging out at the local gas station in a small town. Homer narrates a tale about Mrs. Todd, who is obsessed with finding shortcuts. Homer admires her persistence but begins to have doubts, as there are only so many shortcuts someone can find. Mrs. Todd's habit of resetting her odometer shows remarkable evidence that something strange is going on. He also discovers evidence that her shortcuts are taking fewer miles than are in a straight line between the trip origin and its destination, something that would be impossible in reality. Mrs. Todd compares the shortcuts to folding a map to bring two points closer together, suggesting she has discovered a warped version of reality, akin to a wormhole.

Mrs. Todd finally convinces Homer to take one of the special 'shortcuts'. Homer loses his hat to the grasping arms of a living tree. Soon, he encounters road signs and bizarre animals which he cannot explain. Frightened, Homer doesn't wish to take any more rides. Nonetheless, Mrs. Todd is changing and growing younger with each trip she takes, and the appeal of this overwhelms Homer, despite him discovering a horrifying rodent-like creature on the grill of her car. She brushes this off, seeing the creature as an unfortunate yet normal animal. In the end, Homer, who is looking younger himself, gets into Mrs. Todd's car in front of his friend. It's implied that Mrs. Todd (who by this time is considered to be a missing person together with her car) will now take him into whatever new world which she has found a shortcut to.

References to other works
A reference to Cujo is made when the story mentions Joe Camber getting killed by his own dog.

Reception and significance 
The story has been cited as an example of the use of hyperspace space folding travel outside classic stories of interstellar space travel.

See also
 Stephen King short fiction bibliography

References

Short stories by Stephen King
1984 short stories
Works originally published in Redbook